Nucleolar protein 3 is a protein that in humans is encoded by the NOL3 gene.

Nol3 has been shown to be induced in multiple cancer types and acts as a repressor of apoptosis leading to resistance and proliferation. Paradoxically, loss of Nol3 also leads to hematological disruption in mice resulting in a myeloproliferative neoplasm resembling primary myelofibrosis (PMF), and its deletion has also been detected in patient samples of PMF.

Interactions 

NOL3 has been shown to interact with SFRS9 and Caspase 8.

References

Further reading